Jinjiang railway station is a railway station in Jinjiang, Quanzhou, Fujian Province, People's Republic of China, on the Fuzhou–Xiamen railway which operated by China Railway Nanchang Group, China Railway Corporation.

References

Railway stations in Fujian
Jinjiang, Fujian